is a Japanese anthology manga series written and illustrated by Natsujikei Miyazaki. It was serialized in Kodansha's seinen manga magazine Monthly Morning Two from May 2009 to December 2012, with its chapters collected in a single tankōbon volume.

Publication
Kodansha collected its chapters in a single tankōbon volume, released on November 22, 2012.

Volume

Reception
Henshin no News was one of the Jury Recommended Works at the 17th Japan Media Arts Festival in 2013.

References

External links
 

Manga anthologies
Kodansha manga
Seinen manga